Bastian Karsten Ayong (born 20 January 1998) is a Cameroon-born Czech professional football forward.

He made his senior league debut for Příbram on 4 December 2016 in a Czech First League 2–2 away draw at Mladá Boleslav.

References

External links 
 
 
 Karsten Ayong profile on the 1. FK Příbram official website

Czech footballers
1998 births
Living people
1. FK Příbram players
Piast Gliwice players
Ekstraklasa players
FC DAC 1904 Dunajská Streda players
FK Dukla Prague players
Slovak Super Liga players
Czech First League players
Czech National Football League players
Expatriate footballers in Poland
Expatriate footballers in Slovakia
Czech expatriate sportspeople in Slovakia
Czech expatriate sportspeople in Poland
Association football forwards
Czech people of Cameroonian descent
Expatriate footballers in Thailand